20th Century Girl is a South Korean romance drama film written and directed by Bang Woo-ri in her feature film debut, starring Kim Yoo-jung, Byeon Woo-seok, Park Jung-woo, and Roh Yoon-seo. The film depicts the friendship and freshness of first love against the backdrop of 1999. It was released on October 21, 2022 on Netflix.

Plot 
Set in 1999, the story revolves around Na Bo-ra (Kim Yoo-jung), a seventeen-year-old high school student with a bright personality. Bo-ra's best friend, Yeon-du (Roh Yoon-seo), who has been preparing to visit the US for heart surgery, suddenly declares that she cannot leave as she has fallen in love with a boy from their school whose name she knows as Baek Hyun-jin (Park Jung-woo). Bo-ra promises that she will follow Baek Hyun-jin, find out everything about him, and email what she discovers. Reassured, Yeon-du departs.

At school, Bo-ra starts to follow Hyun-jin. One day, she overhears that Hyun-jin and his best friend Poong Woon-ho (Byeon Woo-seok) will join the broadcasting club at school, so she successfully auditions to join the club. While Woon-ho joins the club, Hyun-jin does not. Bo-ra tries to get close to Woon-ho in order to observe Hyun-jin. 

Hyun-jin, mistaken that Bo-ra is interested in him, asks her to date him only to be rejected by her. Meanwhile, Bo-ra realizes that she has fallen in love with Woon-ho, who has developed feelings for her as well.

When Yeon-du returns to Korea after successful heart surgery, they realize that Bo-ra has been following the wrong boy, and that the real 'Baek Hyun-jin' whom Yeon-du loves is actually Poong Woon-ho, a confusion caused by the boy wearing his friend's school jacket bearing his name tag. Loyal to her friend, and protective because of her health condition, Bo-ra conceals that she loves the same Woon-ho. Then Bo-ra starts to avoid Woon-ho so that their blossoming relationship will end, but through Hyun-jin, Yeon-du learns that Woon-ho and Bo-ra like each other. A tearful Yeon-du tells Bo-ra that she can give up Woon-ho for the sake of their friendship. 

Meanwhile, Woon-ho prepares to move back to New Zealand to resume life with his mother and younger brother. On the day of his departure, with the help of Yeon-du and Hyun-jin, Bo-ra arrives at the train station just in time for them to confess their feelings before separating. They maintain contact while Woon-ho plans to attend university in Seoul. Without explanation, Woon-ho stops answering Bo-ra's emails; she never hears from him again. Heartbroken, confused, and angry, Bo-ra tries to get over him.

Time passes as Bora attends university and matures. In 2019, she receives an invitation to an art exhibition from a person named Joseph, who turns out to be Woon-ho's younger brother, from whom she learns that Woon-ho died all those years ago. Joseph thanks Bo-ra for remembering Woon-ho and says that the happiest moments in Woon-ho's short life were spent in her company. As the film ends, Bo-ra views a video made by Woon-ho that depicts their time together.

Cast

Main 
 Kim Yoo-jung as Na Bo-ra
 Han Hyo-joo as adult Na Bo-ra
 Seventeen-year-old high school student, a Taekwondo practitioner, and a member of the broadcasting club at her school.
 Byeon Woo-seok as Poong Woon-ho
 Bo-ra’s classmate and a member of the broadcasting club.
 Park Jung-woo as Baek Hyun-jin
 Woon-ho’s best friend, a popular man who is liked by his classmates.
 Roh Yoon-seo as Kim Yeon-du
 Bo-ra’s best friend, who has an unrequited love for Hyun-jin.

Supporting
 Kim Sung-kyung as Bo-ra's mother
 Jeong Seok-yong as Bo-ra's father
 Lee Cheon-moo as Na Ba-da, Bo-ra's younger brother
 Yoon Yi-re as 'Madam', Bo-ra's classmate
 Jeon Hye-won as 'Darn it', Bo-ra's classmate

Special appearance 
 Lee Beom-soo as a school teacher
 Park Hae-joon as a doctor at the school infirmary
 Ryu Seung-ryong as Poong Woon-ho's father (voice)
 Gong Myung as Jung Woon-ho, Bo-ra's blind date
 Ong Seong-wu as Poong Jun-ho / Joseph, Poong Woon-ho's younger brother
 Jung Min-joon as young Poong Jun-ho

Production

Development 
Director Bang Woo-ri wrote the script based on her personal experience of exchanging diaries with her friend. The film is set in Cheongju, the director's hometown.

Filming 
Filming took place in Cheongju, North Chungcheong Province from October 2021 to January 2022.

Release 
The film was invited to 27th Busan International Film Festival and premiered at 'Korean Cinema Today - Special Premiere' section on October 6, 2022. It was released on Netflix on October 21, 2022.

Reception

Viewership 
A day later after its release, 20th Century Girl ranked 7th globally on Netflix's movie category. Subsequently on 24 October, it ranked 5th in the same category. Within three days of its release, it debuted at 2 on Netflix's global chart of Top 10 non-English movie category for the week of October 17 to 23, with eight million hours viewed.

Critical response 
Claire Lee, reviewing for Variety, praised the director for capturing "the feeling of devoted teenage friendships ... while acknowledging how they are inevitably meant to change ... as time goes on," as well as Kim Yoo-jung's portrayal as convincing and delightful Bo-ra, but stated, "the film leaves some of its key characters surprisingly unexplored, despite its two-hour running time." Lee concluded, "Though its potential is not fully realized, '20th Century Girl' does manage to add to the timeworn theme of first love by providing a moving examination of what makes certain moments and certain people unforgettable."

In his review in South China Morning Post, James Marsh praised the performance of Kim Yoo-jung as a "dazzling central turn," and described the movie as a "genuinely heartwarming comedy of youthful errors."  Giving 3 stars out of 5, Marsh criticized the appearance of adult Bo-ra, stating "[it] gives the film a heavy-handed and wholly unnecessary tragic coda, somewhat takes the wind out of the sails. Ready Steady Cut's Romey Norton awarded the film 3 stars out of 5, writing, "the film has a relatable story of high-school crushes and errors" and "is very well shot" and appreciated the nostalgia created brought by the film's props and settings. Writing for India Today, Bhavna Agarwal gave the film 3 out of 5 stars, praising Bang Woo-ri's use elements of the 90s to successfully teleports the audience to the last century, her screenplay which keeps the audience hooked, and the charismatic screen presence of Kim Yoo-jung and Byeon Woo-seok.

Kim Kyung-hee of MBC appreciated Kim Yoo-jung's portrayal of Na Bo-ra, which undergirds the cute narrative and comic elements without ruining the overall romantic atmosphere. She stated, "this work has a charm that makes you smile as if it were a memory of your own first love," and [the film] "will be imprinted on the audience as "Korea's representative first love movie."

References

External links
 
 
 
 
 

2020s South Korean films 
2020s Korean-language films 
2020s high school films
South Korean high school films
South Korean teen films
South Korean coming-of-age films
South Korean romantic drama films
Korean-language Netflix original films
Films about friendship
Films set in 1999
Films set in 2019
Films set in North Chungcheong Province
Films shot in North Chungcheong Province
2022 directorial debut films